Investigative journalism is a form of journalism in which reporters deeply investigate a single topic of interest, such as serious crimes, political corruption, or corporate wrongdoing. Practitioners sometimes use the terms "watchdog reporting" or "accountability reporting".

Investigative journalism may also refer to:

Centre for Investigative Journalism, London, England
 Institute for Investigative Journalism, at Concordia University, Montreal, Quebec, Canada
Schuster Institute for Investigative Journalism at Brandeis University
Wisconsin Center for Investigative Journalism, nonprofit organization housed at the University of Wisconsin–Madison
International Consortium of Investigative Journalists

See also
Center for Investigative Reporting (CIR), nonprofit news organization based in Emeryville, California
Investigative Journalism, an episode from the first season of Community
 Philippine Center for Investigative Journalism (PCIJ), a nonprofit media organization based in the Philippines